Missileman or Missile Men or variation, may refer to:

 Missile combat crew, a team of highly trained specialists, oft-called missilemen, manning missile systems 
 Missileman U, a nickname for the Florida Institute of Technology
 Missileman, a chapter of the Japanese manga comic Hunter X Hunter, see List of Hunter × Hunter chapters
 Missile Men, a DC Comics supervillain team

See also

 Infantry Anti-Tank Missileman Leaders Course at the United States Marine Corps School of Infantry
 Field Artillery Missileman's Badge
 Master Missileman Badge
 Missile (disambiguation)
 Missileer (disambiguation)
 Rocket Man (disambiguation)

Disambiguation pages